Steve, Steven or Stephen Thompson (or Thomson) may refer to:

Sportspeople

Association football
Stephen Thompson (football chairman), chairman of Scottish football club Dundee United
Steve Thompson (footballer, born 1955), English-born football defender and manager, who played for Lincoln City and Charlton Athletic
Steve Thompson (footballer, born 1963), English-born footballer with Bristol City and Wycombe, and player and manager with Yeovil
Steve Thompson (footballer, born 1964), English-born footballer who played for Bolton Wanderers and Leicester
Steve Thompson (footballer, born 1972), English footballer for Gillingham
Steve Thompson (footballer, born 1989), English-born footballer who played for Port Vale
Steven Thompson (Scottish footballer) (born 1978), Scottish footballer and pundit, who played for Dundee United, Rangers, Cardiff City, Burnley and St. Mirren. 
Steven Thomson (born 1978), Scottish footballer, currently at Dover Athletic

Other sports
Stephen Thompson (fighter) (born 1983), American MMA fighter
Steve Thompson (rugby union) (born 1978), English rugby union player
Stephen Thompson (basketball) (born 1968), American basketball coach and former player
Stephen Thompson Jr. (born 1997), American basketball player
Steve Thompson (defensive tackle, born 1945), American football defensive tackle
Steve Thompson (defensive tackle, born 1965) (1965–2016), American football defensive tackle

Other people
Stephen W. Thompson (1894–1977), American aviator of World War I
Steve Thompson (musician), American record producer and mixer
Steve Thompson (songwriter) (born 1952), British musician, songwriter and record producer
Stephen Thompson (journalist) (born 1972), American music journalist
Stephen Thompson (writer) (born 1967), British playwright and screenwriter
Steven L. Thompson (born 1948), American motorcycling writer
Steve M. Thompson (born 1944), American politician (Alaska)
Steve Thompson (Georgia politician) (born 1950), state senator from Georgia (U.S. state)
Steve Thompson (Louisiana politician) (born 1935), state senator from Franklin Parish from 1988 to 1996
Steve Thomson (politician), British Columbia MLA